Russia participated in the Eurovision Song Contest 2013 in Malmö, Sweden. The Russian entry was selected through an internal selection, organised by Russian broadcaster Channel One Russia (C1R). Dina Garipova represented Russia with the song "What If", which qualified from the first semi-final of the competition and placed 5th in the final with 174 points.

Before Eurovision

Internal selection 
On 30 November 2012, C1R announced a submission period for interested artists and composers to submit their entries through an online form. On 19 February 2013, C1R announced that they had internally selected Dina Garipova to represent Russia in Malmö. Garipova previously won the first season of talent show Golos. The Russian song, "What If", was presented to the public on 24 February 2013 during the C1R television programme Vremya. "What If" was written and composed by Gabriel Alares, Joakim Bjornberg and Leonid Gutkin.

Participants 
Among the competing artists were 2013 Ukrainian national final participant Alina Grosu, and 2012 Russian national final participants "Shinshilli", who participated with the song "Pushkin Sasha", but didn't qualify from auditions.

Plagiarism accusations
After the presentation of the song, several media outlets reported the possibility of plagiarism of several previously released songs: "Skin on Skin" originally recorded by Sarah Connor, "Pozwól życ" originally recorded by Gosia Andrzejewicz, "All Over The World" originally recorded by Brian Kennedy and "Carried Away" originally recorded by Hear'Say. Leonid Gutkin, one of the composers of the song, dismissed the plagiarism accusations.

Promotion
On 14 March, Garipova promoted the song during the second semi-final of the Moldovan national final.

At Eurovision

Russia was allocated to compete in the first semi-final on 14 May for a place in the final on 18 May. In the first semifinal, the producers of the show decided that Russia would perform 6th, following Denmark and preceding Ukraine. On stage, Garipova was joined by four backing vocalists: Alexandra Hamnede, Anders von Hofsten, Sofia Lilja and song co-author Gabriel Alares. The Russian performance featured Garipova dressed in a long beige dress, surrounded by shining white bubbles.

Russia qualified from the first semi-final, placing 2nd and scoring 156 points. At the first semi-final winners' press conference, Russia was allocated to perform in the first half of the final. In the final, the producers of the show decided that Russia would perform 10th, following Malta and preceding Germany. Russia placed 5th in the final, scoring 174 points.

In Russia, both the semi-finals and the final were broadcast on Channel One, with commentary provided by Yana Churikova and Yuriy Aksyuta.

The national jury that provided 50% of the Russian vote in the first semi-final and the final consisted of composer Vladimir Matetsky and four previous Russian participants in the Contest: Youddiph (1994), Philipp Kirkorov (1995), Yulia Savicheva (2004) and Dima Bilan (2006 and 2008). The Russian spokesperson in the grand final was Alsou, who had represented Russia previously in the 2000 Contest as well as co-hosting the final in 2009.

Voting

Points awarded to Russia

Points awarded by Russia

References

2013
Countries in the Eurovision Song Contest 2013
Eurovision